Pál Závada (born 14 December 1954 in Tótkomlós, Hungary) is a Hungarian writer. 
He is a member of the Slovak minority in Hungary, but he writes in Hungarian.

His elder son, Péter Závada, is a poet and rapper of the underground hip-hop duo, Akkezdet Phiai.

Books
Kulákprés. Család- és falutörténeti szociográfia. Tótkomlós, 1945–1956 (1991)
Mielőtt elsötétül (1996)
Jadviga párnája (1997)
Milota (2002)
A fényképész utókora (2004)
Idegen testünk (2008)
Harminchárom szlovák népmese (2010)
Egy sor cigány. Huszonnégy mai magyar (2011)
Janka estéi (2012)
Természetes fény (2014)
Hajó a ködben (2019)

References

People from Tótkomlós
Hungarian writers
Hungarian people of Slovak descent
Living people
1954 births